BBA may refer to:

Academics
Bachelor of Business Administration (BBA), an undergraduate collegiate degree in business administration

Entertainment
Beck, Bogert & Appice, a hard rock power trio
Big Brain Academy, a video game
Big Brother Africa, a reality TV series

Law
Balanced Budget Act, a 1997 U.S. legislative package
Balanced budget amendment, a type of constitutional rule

Organisations
Bachpan Bachao Andolan, an NGO against child labour in India
Boston Bar Association
British Bankers Association
British Board of Agrément

Places
Bordj Bou Arreridj Province, Algeria
Bordj Bou Arreridj, the capital city
Berlin Brandenburg Airport, Berlin, Germany

Science, medicine and technology
Bilateral breast augmentation
Biochimica et Biophysica Acta, a biochemical journal
Dreamcast Broadband Adapter
Nintendo GameCube Broadband Adapter

Other
 Best Bitter Ale, a beer style in the UK
Burr and Burton Academy, a secondary school in Manchester, VT
BBA Aviation, an aviation services company
Bush Boake Allen
Short form of Japanese derogatory slang "" (Old hag)

See also

 
 B2A (disambiguation)
 BA (disambiguation)